Tarsozeuzera vavizola is a moth in the family Cossidae. It was described by Yakovlev in 2006. It is found in southern Thailand.

The length of the forewings is about 16 mm. The forewings are grey with a reticulate pattern along the outer margin and in the tornal area. The hindwings are greyish.

Etymology
The species name is derived from the abbreviation Va (for Vadim), vi (for Viktorovich) and zol (for Zolotuhin) and refers to Vadim Zolotuhin, a Russian lepidopterologist.

References

Natural History Museum Lepidoptera generic names catalog

Zeuzerinae
Moths described in 2006